Agapanthia asphodeli is a species of beetle in the family Cerambycidae found in Algeria, Central, Eastern and Western Europe, Tunisia and Turkey. Just like its cousin Agapanthia villosoviridescens, the species is brown coloured and has yellow lines along the elytron.

References

asphodeli
Beetles described in 1804
Beetles of North Africa
Beetles of Asia
Beetles of Europe